Ethiopia  competed in the 2003 All-Africa Games held at the National Stadium in the city of Abuja, Nigeria. The team wielded a very strong athletic contingent, which brought back a total of five gold, six silver and four bronze medals. Amongst the gold medal winners were future multiple Olympic gold medal winners Kenenisa Bekele and Meseret Defar. In boxing, the team brought back a silver and two bronze medals. At the end of the event, the team had won a total of twenty medals, the largest number that it had won in the history of the Games, and came eighth overall in the medal table.

Competitors
Ethiopia has been a consistent attendee at the All-Africa Games. In 2003, the country entered sixty five events, including thirty one for men and thirty four for women. The athletics contingent was particularly strong. Among the competitors was Meseret Defar, winner of two Olympic gold medals and twice world record holder, and Kenenisa Bekele, who won three Olympic medals and the first to win both the 5000 metre and 10,000 metre titles at the World Championships. The country also entered the women’s football tournament, which was the first time that the sport had been played at the Games. Much was hoped for, especially given the unprecedented haul of fourteen medals in 1999. The team did not disappoint and achieved an even higher tally.

Medal table

Medal summary
Ethiopia won twenty medals, consisting of five gold, eight silver and seven bronze, and was ranked eighth in the final medal table. This was the largest haul of medals that the country had achieved during the history of the Games, exceeding the previous record, achieved in 1999, by six.

List of Medalists

Gold Medal

Silver Medal

Bronze Medal

References

2003 in Ethiopian sport
Nations at the 2003 All-Africa Games
2003